Lloyd J. Reynolds (1902–1978) was an American calligrapher and professor at Reed College (1929–1969) who taught classes on creative writing, art, and calligraphy. Lloyd Reynolds was born in 1902 in Bemidji, Minnesota. He received a BA in Botany and Forestry from Oregon State University, then an English degree at the University of Oregon. He went on to receive an MA in English literature from the University of Oregon.

Reynolds started at Reed in 1929 in the English Department, teaching creative writing, then began teaching classes on art history and graphic arts. Reynolds classes continued for several decades, and his students included Gary Snyder, Philip Whalen, Peter Norton, Charles Bigelow, David Eddings Willard McCarty, Kris Holmes, Sumner Stone and informally Steve Jobs.  Starting in 1949, Reynolds began teaching calligraphy classes at Reed, and retired from Reed and his last class in 1969. The calligraphy program at Reed was continued by Robert Palladino until the cancellation of the program by the college in 1984.

In 1954, Reynolds was targeted in the House Un-American Activities Committee, as were two other Reed professors. He reportedly refused to testify at the hearing.

Reynolds was named Calligrapher Laureate of Oregon by Governor Tom McCall in 1972. He died in October 1978.

The Reed College Special Collections houses the Lloyd J. Reynolds Collection. The Cooley Gallery hosted the exhibition "Lloyd Reynolds: A Life of Forms in Art" in 2011.

Publications
 Reynolds, Lloyd J. Italic Lettering & Handwriting: Exercise Book. Portland, Ore: Champoeg Press, 1963. 
 Reynolds, Lloyd J. 1969. Italic calligraphy and handwriting: exercises and text. New York: Pentalic. 
 Reynolds, Lloyd J. Weathergrams. Portland, Ore: Society for Italic Handwriting, Reed College, 1972. 
 Reynolds, Lloyd J. Handwriting & Calligraphy. Oregon Rainbow: 4 (1976) 32–39. 	
 Reynolds, Lloyd J. 1979. Straight impressions. Woolwich, Me: TBW Books.

References

External links
 The Calligraphy Heritage of Reed College

American calligraphers
1902 births
1978 deaths
Reed College faculty
People from Bemidji, Minnesota
Oregon State University alumni